Kedron may refer to:

Places

Australia 
Kedron Brook, a creek that flows through the northern suburbs of Brisbane, Queensland
 Kedron, Queensland, a suburb of Brisbane, Queensland
 Kedron State High School, a secondary school

United States 
Kedron Creek, a stream in Minnesota, United States
Kedron, West Virginia, United States

Other uses 
Kedron of Alexandria, an early patriarch of the Orthodox Church at Alexandria
 An alternative name of Kentro in Greece and in modern transliteration of Greek meaning centre
 An Intel PRO/Wireless 4965AGN IEEE 802.11 a/b/g/n mini-PCIe WiFi adapter, part of the Santa Rosa Platform

See also
Kidron (disambiguation)